Ivan "Dzhonrid" Alexandrovich Svanidze (1927 – 1987), was a Soviet academic who specialized in agriculture and African Studies. He was the nephew of Joseph Stalin through his first wife, Ketevan Svanidze, and the third husband of Stalin's youngest daughter, Svetlana Alliluyeva.

Early life
Svanidze was the son of Old Bolshevik Alexander Svanidze and Maria Anisimovna (née Korona). His parents were Georgians; his father's family were minor nobility from Kutais Governorate. His mother was from a Jewish family in Tiflis, and was an opera singer at the Tiflis Opera and Ballet Theatre.

Their son was born in Berlin, Weimar Republic, where his father was working as part of a trade mission. They named him after American socialist John Reed, best known for his account of the Russian Revolution, Ten Days That Shook the World. His name was Russified "Dzhonrid", and he was often called "Dzhono", "Dzhoni" or "Vano." He also used the name Ivan, the Russian version of John.

Education and career
He graduated from Moscow State University with a degree in history. In 1964, he received a Ph.D. from the USSR Academy of Sciences's Institute of African Studies. He received a second doctorate in economics in 1978.

References

Bibliography
Сельское хозяйство Северной Родезии (Agriculture of Northern Rhodesia), Moscow, 1963.
Динамизация сельского хозяйства стран Африки (Dynamization of African Agriculture),  Institute of African Studies,c 1969.
Проблемы развития сельского хозяйства Африки (The Problems of African Agricultural Development), Nauka, Moscow, 1969.
Сельское хозяйство Тропической Африки (Agriculture in Tropical Africa), Thought, Moscow, 1972.
Сельское хозяйство и аграрный строй Тропической Африки (Agriculture and Agrarian Systems in Sub-Saharan Africa),  Nauka, Moscow, 1977.
Южная Родезия (Southern Rhodesia), with Tamara G. Janjgava), Thought, Moscow, 1977.
Лесото ; Свазиленд (Lesotho; Swaziland), Moscow, Thought, 1978.

External links
"Svetlana Alliluyeva and Her Men" — Russian TV documentary

1927 births
1987 deaths
Soviet academics
Soviet writers
Stalin family
Moscow State University alumni
Academic staff of Moscow State University
Soviet Jews
Russian people of Georgian descent
Russian people of Jewish descent